Vagaria is a genus of Mediterranean plants in the Amaryllis family, widely cultivated as an ornamental because of its attractive white flowers.

Species 
Vagaria ollivieri Maire  -  Morocco
Vagaria parviflora (Desf. ex Delile) Herb.   - Turkey, Syria, Lebanon, Israel, Palestine

References

Amaryllidaceae genera